Donald Kreg Llewellyn (born August 11, 1967) was a Canadian water skier. Llewellyn won a silver medal in each of Pan American Games Champion when he won gold in men's water skiing events at the games in slalom at the 1995 Pan American Games as well as in 1999. He was inducted into the Alberta Sports Hall of Fame in 2019. Llewellyn was an innovator, having helped invent the skurfer a precursor to the wakeboard. Llewellyn held 24 Canadian records and won 7 individual World Championship medals. His brother Jaret Llewellyn is also a professional water skier with Pan American Games titles and his nephew Dorien Llewellyn is also a professional water skier.

References 

1967 births
Living people
Canadian water skiers
Pan American Games silver medalists for Canada
Medalists at the 1999 Pan American Games
Pan American Games medalists in water skiing
Water skiers at the 1999 Pan American Games
Medalists at the 1995 Pan American Games